Shoshi may refer to:

Shoshi, a historical tribe (fis) and region of northern Albania 
Shosh, Albania, village of northern Albania and historical center of that region

People with the surname
, Japanese shogi player
Lis Shoshi (born 1994), Kosovan basketball player
Maringlen Shoshi (born 1987), Albanian footballer
Zef Shoshi, Albanian painter

See also
Princess Shōshi (disambiguation)
Empress Shōshi (988-1074)

Japanese-language surnames